Bajdy refers to the following places in Poland:

 Bajdy, Podkarpackie Voivodeship
 Bajdy, Warmian-Masurian Voivodeship